The Evening Telegraph Challenge Cup (initially known as the City of Discovery Cup) was a pre-season football played in 2005 and 2006, based in Dundee, involving the two Dundee clubs - Dundee and Dundee United.

Format
The 2006 format was a single match between the two Dundee clubs, although the inaugural competition (2005) was a standard four-team knock-out competition.

History
The Cup's inaugural showing was a standard four-team cup format, which saw Dundee United beat Sheffield Wednesday 2–1 in the final. United beat rivals Dundee in the first semi-final, while Sheffield Wednesday saw off Wolverhampton Wanderers on penalties in the other.

On 29 March 2006, it was announced the 2006 tournament would be slimmed down to a single derby match between Dundee and Dundee United. On 22 June 2006, sponsorship was announced for the competition, which would see it renamed the Evening Telegraph Challenge Cup; Radio Tay would also sponsor the event. The match was preceded by celebrity and fans matches.

In 2007, the tournament was to be scheduled for an international weekend during the season, as Dundee United played Barcelona and did not wish to play a pre-season derby so close after that match. However, the season passed without the match being played. The fixture was not announced for the following season either and has not been contested since.

Past tournaments/winners

2005
Semi-finals

3rd place play-off

Final

2006
Final

Winners
1
  Dundee
  Dundee United

Top goalscorers

Trivia
 Both finals were held at Dens Park.

References

Sports competitions in Dundee
Scottish football friendly trophies
Defunct football cup competitions in Scotland
Football in Dundee